Juniperus jaliscana, known commonly as the Jalisco juniper, is a species of conifer in the cypress family, Cupressaceae.

It is endemic to Mexico, where it is known from only two locations, in Durango and Jalisco.

References

jaliscana
Endemic flora of Mexico
Trees of Durango
Trees of Jalisco
Flora of Northeastern Mexico
Flora of Southwestern Mexico
Endangered biota of Mexico
Endangered flora of North America
Taxonomy articles created by Polbot
Plants described in 1946